Cracksman means "burglar" or "safebreaker". It can also refer to:

The Amateur Cracksman, an 1899 short story collection by E. W. Hornung, the first one about his gentleman thief character A. J. Raffles
The Mystery of the Fiddling Cracksman, a novel by Harry Stephen Keeler about a cracksman who uses a violin instead of dynamite
The Cracksman, a 1963 British comedy film directed by Peter Graham Scott
Cracksman (horse) (foaled 2014), a British Thoroughbred racehorse.